Orkla may refer to:

Places
 Orkla (river), a river in Trøndelag county, Norway

Business
 Orkla Group (or Orkla ASA), a large Norwegian company
 Orkla Mining Company, a historic company in Norway
 Orkla Metall, a former smelting company in Norway
 Orkla Media, a former media company in Norway